Iqrit ( or إقرث, Iqrith) was a Palestinian Christian village, located  northeast of Acre. Originally allotted to form part of an Arab state under the proposed 1947 UN Partition Plan, it was seized and  depopulated by the Israel Defense Forces (IDF) during the 1948 Arab-Israeli War, and their territory later became part of the new State of Israel. All of its Christian inhabitants were forced to flee to Lebanon or the Israeli village of Rameh, and, despite the promise that they would be returned in two weeks' time, the villagers were not allowed to return. In 1951, in response to a plea from the Iqrit villagers, the Israel Supreme Court ruled that the former residents of Iqrit be allowed to return to their homes. However, before that happened, the IDF, despite awareness of the Supreme Court decision, destroyed Iqrit. Descendants to this day maintain an outpost in the village church, and bury their dead in its cemetery. All attempts to cultivate its lands are uprooted by the Israel Lands Administration.

History

Archaeological sites
Iqrit contains mosaic floors, remains of a wine press, rock-hewn tombs, cisterns, and granite implements. The village also has many other archaeological sites in its vicinity. The Canaanites erected a statue for the god Melqart of Tyre in the village. When the Crusaders occupied Iqrit, they called it Acref. Açref is a name still commonly used for the village among surrounding Bedouin tribes. The village area contained numerous archaeological sites.

Ottoman era
Incorporated into the Ottoman Empire in 1517 with all of Palestine, Iqrit appeared in the 1596 tax registers  as being in the  nahiya (subdistrict) of Akka under the Liwa of Safad with a population numbered 374, and  an economy dependent largely on goats, beehives and agriculture. There was a press used for  olive or  grape production.

In  1875,  Victor Guérin passed by the village. He was told it was "very considerable" and inhabited by Maronites and Greeks Orthodox.
In 1881, the PEF's Survey of Western Palestine (SWP)  called it Akrith, and described  it as "A village, built of stone, containing about 100 Christians; there is a modern chapel in the village; it is situated on a tell, with figs, olives, and arable land; there are three springs to the west of the village and fourteen cisterns, rock-cut, to supply water."

British Mandate era
Like a number of other villages in the neighborhood, Iqrit was linked to the coastal highway from Acre to Ras an-Naqura via a secondary road leading to Tarbikha. Of this, 458 dunams were plantations and irrigable land; 1,088 were used for cereals, while 68 dunams were built-up (urban) land.

At the moment of their eviction in November 1948, there were 491 citizens in Iqrit, 432 of them Melkites (Greek Catholics), inhabiting the entire area of the village. Some of the 59 Muslims of the village rented their homes in Iqrit, while others built their houses in esh-Shafaya.

Only part of the village land was cultivated and the rest was covered with woods of oak, laurel and carob trees. By 1948, the village owned about 600 dunams (600,000 m²) of private property with groves of fig trees that served all inhabitants of Iqrit and the surroundings. The groves covered the hill of al-Bayad, and the remaining cultivated land was used for crops of lentils, as well as tobacco and other fruit trees.

There were a private elementary school which was administrated by the Greek Catholic Archdiocese, two natural water springs, and many other water-wells for collected rainwater within the village area, including a large pool for rainwater. There were many threshing floors mainly located between the built-up village lands and the cemetery.

The large  Melkite (Greek Catholic) church remains standing.

Capture and expulsion

According to Morris, the villagers of Iqrit were outright expelled by the Israeli Army in November 1948, (together with the villagers of  Kafr Bir'im, Nabi Rubin and Tarbikha) "without Cabinet knowledge, debate, or approval - though, almost inevitably, they received post facto  Cabinet endorsement." While some of the former inhabitants of Iqrit became refugees in Lebanon, most are now internally displaced Palestinians who are also citizens of Israel.
Iqrit was captured on October 31, 1948 by the Haganah's Oded Brigade during Operation Hiram, an Israeli offensive which advanced on the coastal road towards Lebanon.
Iqrit and Tarbikha surrendered and the villagers stayed in their homes. That situation did not last for long. Iqrit and a number of other villages in the region were affected by a policy known as "an Arabless border strip".

Expulsion
Six days after its surrender, on 5 November 1948, the Israeli Army ordered the villagers to surrender the village, and that they would be returned in two weeks' time when the military operations were over. Some went to Lebanon and the Israeli Army trucked the majority to Rame, a town between Acre and Safad.

Israeli Supreme Court rules in favor of allowing Iqrit residents to return to their village
In July 1951, the villagers of Iqrit pleaded their case before Israel's Supreme Court, and the court ruled in favour of the right to return to their village. After this judgement, the Military Government found another justification to prevent them from returning. The villagers appealed to the Supreme Court again and were scheduled to have their case considered on 6 February 1952.

IDF ignores Supreme Court decision, destroys Iqrit on Christmas day, 1951
However, on Christmas Day in 1951, Israeli Defense Forces
destroyed the village. According to the Washington Report on Middle East Affairs
Israeli soldiers took the mukhtar of Iqrit to the top of a nearby hill to force him to watch as Israeli troops blew up every house in the village.

In his book Blood Brothers, Father Elias Chacour, who was a child away at school at the time, records the story of what happened, as told to him by his brothers:

In its third verdict (February 1952), the court blamed the villagers for depending on promises from the military ruler of Galilee, instead of benefiting from the legal remedy which was given to them by the court in its first relevant verdict.

Aftermath to the present-day
Following the war the area was incorporated into the State of Israel and a number of new Jewish villages were established near or on the village's land, including Shomera (1949 on Tarbikha ruins), Even Menachem (1960) and Gornot HaGalil (1980).

Today, only the building of the Melkite Greek Catholic church still stands. There is rubble from the destroyed houses and some fig, grape, almond, olive and other orchards. On the shoulder looking at the road passing by from the north, the cemetery of Iqrit is still located, fenced and annually maintained. There is a cowshed that belongs to the moshav of Shomera, on the western entrance of the village, as well.

The first legal action against the state of Israel was brought in 1951 by 5 men of Iqrit when Muhammad Nimr al-Hawari acting as their lawyer was instrumental in gaining the right of return for the men of Iqrit. On 31 July 1951 the Israeli courts recognised the rights of the villagers to their land and their right to return to it. The court said the land was not abandoned and therefore could not be placed under the Custodian of Absentee Property.

In the 1970s, villagers from Iqrit conducted a series of sit-ins in the town's former church over a period of six years, and the case of Iqrit (and of Kafr Bir'im) was frequently covered by the Israeli media. Several prominent Israeli cultural and artistic figures supported the movement to repatriate the Iqrit villagers and public empathy for their plight was widespread. While the Israeli authorities recognized the right to return of the villagers in principle, officials resisted implementing this right. Said Golda Meir in 1972: It is not only consideration of security [that prevent] an official decision regarding Bi'rim and Iqrit, but the desire to avoid [setting] a precedent. We cannot allow ourselves to become more and more entangled and to reach a point from which we are unable to extricate ourselves." Meron Benvenisti notes how it has been argued that the villagers of Iqrit and Bi'rim are not the only present-absentees in Israel, and therefore recognizing their  right of return is perceived as setting a "dangerous precedent" that would be followed by other similar demands. However, Benvenisti himself has argued that it could be a positive precedent if the Iqrit villagers were to be allocated the small amount of empty land they need to establish a community settlement on their own land.

The operational name of the Munich massacre of Israeli athletes in 1972 was named after this town and Kafr Bir'im.

In 2003, some of Iqrit's villagers repetitioned the Supreme Court so as to facilitate their return to Iqrit, but the petition was rejected by the court. Villagers continue to hold out hope for their right of return. Recently, four families built their houses opposite the village from west, on a side hill of al-Bayad.

Afterwards, in August 2012, a large demonstration was held in the city of Haifa demanding Israel to grant the descendants the right of return to both villages that suffered the same depopulation and destruction, Iqrit and Kafr Bir'im. Since the last Roots Camp in 2012, a group of the village's youngsters decided to stay in the village and conduct their lives as regular villagers; this came as an act of opposition to the Israeli government's continued dismissal of the case.

See also
Depopulated Palestinian locations in Israel

References

Bibliography

 
 

  

 

 chapter 4

External links
Iqrit Heritage Society
Iqrit, Electronic Intifada
Iqrit Palestine Remembered
Iqrit,  Zochrot
Survey of Western Palestine, Map 3:  IAA, Wikimedia commons 
Iqrit, from the Khalil Sakakini Cultural Center
Iqrith, from Dr. Moslih Kanaaneh
Justice for Ikrit and Biram Haaretz, 10 October 2001
Clinging to dream of Palestine village BBC News, 23 April 2008
, from  Zochrot

Arab villages depopulated after the 1948 Arab–Israeli War
District of Acre